The 14th Directors Guild of America Awards, honoring the outstanding directorial achievements in film and television in 1961, were presented in 1962.

Winners and nominees

Film

Television

Honorary Life Member
 Hobe Morrison

External links
 

Directors Guild of America Awards
1961 film awards
1961 television awards
Direct
Direct
1961 awards in the United States